"The After Hours" is episode thirty-four of the American television anthology series, The Twilight Zone. It originally aired on June 10, 1960, on CBS.

Opening narration

The opening narration involves Marsha White riding an elevator to the ninth floor. Then the rest of the narration is heard.

Plot
Marsha White, browsing for a gift for her mother in a department store, decides on a gold thimble. She is taken by the male elevator operator to the ninth floor, although the elevator's floor indicator only shows eight floors. After she walks out onto the barren, seemingly deserted ninth floor, confused, she is approached by a saleswoman who guides her to the only item on the floor: the exact gold thimble that Marsha wants. During the sales transaction, she grows increasingly puzzled by the comments and actions of both the somewhat frustrated elevator operator who transported her to there and the aloof and clairvoyant saleswoman behind the counter who addresses her by name and sells her the thimble. The saleswoman asks Marsha if she is happy; Marsha responds that it is none of her business and storms off. As Marsha rides the elevator down, she notices that the thimble is scratched and dented; she is directed by the elevator operator to the complaints department on the third floor.

When she tries to convince Mr. Armbruster, the sales supervisor, and Mr. Sloan, the store manager, that she bought the item on the ninth floor, she is told that the store does not have a ninth floor. She has no evidence of the transaction as she paid cash, and has no receipt. Marsha then sees the saleswoman who sold her the thimble, and is shocked to discover that the woman is actually one of the department store's display mannequins. While resting in an office after the shock of her frightening discovery, Marsha finds herself accidentally locked inside the closed store after hours. She attempts to find a way out and becomes alarmed by mysterious voices calling to her and by some subtle movements made by the supposedly lifeless mannequins around her. Moving about aimlessly, she topples the sailor mannequin, whom she recognizes as the elevator operator in earlier encounters.

Becoming hysterical, she flees backward to the now-open elevator, which again transports her to the unoccupied ninth floor. There she gradually realizes that the "ninth floor" is a storage area occupied by thinking, animated mannequins. With the mannequins' gentle encouragement, she eventually realizes that she herself is also a mannequin. Within their society, the mannequins take turns, one at a time, to live among humans for one month.  Marsha had enjoyed her stay among "the outsiders" so much that she had forgotten her identity and has arrived back a day late. The next mannequin in line — the saleswoman — forgives Marsha for her tardiness and then departs the store to live among humans for a month. As the other mannequins bid farewell to the saleswoman, the sailor asks Marsha if she enjoyed her time among humans; she sweetly and sadly says she did.

The next day, Armbruster makes his morning rounds on the sales floor and does a double-take upon passing the Marsha mannequin on display.

Closing narration

Production notes
The head of the mannequin double for Anne Francis was made from a cast of Francis's face done by noted make-up artist William J. Tuttle. Tuttle displayed the mannequin head in the 1968 MGM short film "The King of the Duplicators".

Remake

The episode was remade in 1986 for the first revival of The Twilight Zone. It starred Terry Farrell as Marsha Cole and Ann Wedgeworth as the Saleswoman. The plot is similar, but the emphasis is more on suspense. In addition, the Marsha in the remake is in denial of her identity and does not want to be a mannequin. She wants to be truly human, unlike the Marsha in the original, who simply forgot who she was and enjoyed feeling human for the month in which she lived among the outsiders.

Graphic novel
In 2008, the original episode was adapted as a graphic novel, Rod Serling's The Twilight Zone: The After Hours, written by Mark Kneece and illustrated by Rebekah Isaacs.

Further reading
DeVoe, Bill. (2008). Trivia from The Twilight Zone. Albany, GA: Bear Manor Media. 
Grams, Martin. (2008). The Twilight Zone: Unlocking the Door to a Television Classic. Churchville, MD: OTR Publishing.

References

External links
 

1960 American television episodes
The Twilight Zone (1959 TV series season 1) episodes
Television episodes written by Rod Serling
Television episodes directed by Douglas Heyes